Hudeje ( or ) is a settlement north of Trebnje in eastern Slovenia. Historically the area was part of Lower Carniola and the entire Municipality of Trebnje is now included in the Southeast Slovenia Statistical Region.

History
In 2014, Vejar (formerly the hamlet of V blatih) was administratively separated from the village and made a separate settlement.

References

External links
Hudeje at Geopedia

Populated places in the Municipality of Trebnje